Achtheres is a genus of arthropods belonging to the family Lernaeopodidae.

The genus was first described by Nordmann in 1832.

The species of this genus are found in Europe and Northern America.

Species:
 Achtheres ambloplitis Kellicott, 1880
 Achtheres lacae Krøyer, 1863
 Achtheres microptera Wright, 1882
 Achtheres micropteri Wright, 1882
 Achtheres percarum Nordmann, 1832
 Achtheres pimelodi Krøyer, 1863

References

Siphonostomatoida
Crustacean genera